The 2015 Carlton Football Club season was the Carlton Football Club's 152nd season of competition, and 119th as a member of the Australian Football League.

Competing in the 2015 AFL season, it was a very poor season for the club and was disrupted by the sacking after only eight rounds of third-year coach Mick Malthouse. Carlton finished last on the ladder with a record of 4–18.

Club summary
The 2015 AFL season was the 119th season of the VFL/AFL competition since its inception in 1897; and, having competed in every season, it was also the 119th season contested by the Carlton Football Club. Carlton's primary home ground for games was the Melbourne Cricket Ground, with the club hosting six matches at the venue and five at Etihad Stadium – a small change from the previous season, when the club had played six games at Etihad Stadium and five at the Melbourne Cricket Ground. Traditional home ground at Princes Park (which was renamed from Visy Park to Ikon Park from the start of the year under a two-year naming rights deal with Ikon Services Australia) continued to serve as the training and administrative base.  Carlton continued its alignment with the Northern Blues in the Victorian Football League, allowing Carlton-listed players to play with the Northern Blues when not selected in AFL matches.

Following an online vote of members, the club changed the font of the CFC monogram on the front of its playing guernsey. The new monogram, more traditional in style, featured block-style letters and no gaps at the intersections between letters; it matched the design which had been used between 1927 and 1997, and which had thrice been worn as a heritage guernsey during the 2014 season.

The club's membership for the 2015 season was 47,305, a 0.4% reduction from the 2014 membership of 47,485; it was Carlton's second consecutive reduction in membership, and the club was one of only three clubs to suffer a drop in membership in the 2015 season. The club made a net operating loss of $2,700,000 for the season.

Senior Personnel
Mark LoGiudice continued as club president, a role he has held since June 2014. Mick Malthouse began the season as senior coach, with his coaching panel unchanged from 2014; following Malthouse’s dismissal on 26 May, backline assistant coach John Barker stepped in as caretaker.

Marc Murphy continued into his third season as club captain, as part of a five-man leadership group, a reduction from the seven-man group which led the team in 2014. Bryce Gibbs, Lachlan Henderson and Michael Jamison remained in the group from 2014 – Gibbs and Jamison were named vice-captains – and Sam Rowe was elevated to the group. Leaving the group were Andrew Carrazzo and Kade Simpson, who both stepped down from the group after serving in it for many years, and Brock McLean, who was delisted.

Squad for 2015
Flags represent the state of origin, i.e. the state in which the player played his Under-18s football.

For players: (c) denotes captain, (vc) denotes vice-captain, (dvc) denotes deputy vice-captain, (lg) denotes leadership group.
For coaches: (s) denotes senior coach, (cs) denotes caretaker senior coach, (a) denotes assistant coach, (d) denotes development coach.

Playing list changes

The following summarises all player changes between the conclusion of the 2014 season and the conclusion of the 2015 season.

In

Out

List management

Season summary

Pre-season matches
The club's three scheduled pre-season matches were played as part of the 2015 NAB Challenge series.

Home and away season
Carlton performed very poorly in the early part of the home-and-away season. The club fell to last place after Round 7, won one of its first eight games – against defending wooden spooner  in Round 4 – and lost four games by more than ten goals. The turndown in form placed significant pressure on Carlton's off-field organisation. The club had engaged in optimistic preseason marketing, which included Mick Malthouse telling the media that "it’s very, very difficult to see where we’re going to lose a game"; but after only the second round, a 69-point loss against West Coast, Steven Trigg and Mark LoGiudice publicly declared that the club was in a phase of rebuilding. The following weeks were characterised by poor performances and low crowds, which resulted in speculation about Malthouse's coaching future with the club. Early in the season, LoGiudice guaranteed that Malthouse would retain his job until the end of the season, but on May 25, he announced a revised position that Malthouse's tenure would be reviewed during the Round 11 bye week. The following morning, Malthouse gave an interview on SEN 1116 in which he was openly critical of the club's administration: he blamed the club's poor performances in part on the psychological effect of Trigg's and LoGiudice's talk of rebuilding; he said he believed LoGiudice's administration had never intended to retain him as coach even before the season began; and he made allegations that , during Carlton CEO Steven Trigg's tenure there, had illegally signed a contract with Eddie Betts eighteen months before he became an eligible free agent (Betts had transferred from Carlton to Adelaide at the end of 2013 as a restricted free agent, and the AFL dismissed Malthouse's allegations). Consequently, Malthouse was dismissed that afternoon.

Backline assistant coach John Barker was installed as caretaker coach for the remainder of the season. The club's performances improved over the following six weeks, with two wins and two close losses, but the end of the season was little better than the start, and Carlton won only one of its last ten matches, finishing last on percentage. It was Carlton's first last place finish since 2006, and the fourth in the club's VFL/AFL history.

Across the season, Carlton had a record of 3–3 in six matches against other clubs in the bottom six, all of whom won seven or fewer games for the season. Against all other clubs, Carlton's record was 1–15, the sole win coming against 9th-placed .

Ladder

Team awards and records
Match records
Rounds 6–9 – Carlton recorded 13 consecutive losing quarters, starting with the third quarter in Round 6 and ending with the third quarter in Round 9; it set a new record as the longest such streak in the club's history.
Round 7 – 's score of 19.21 (135) and winning margin of 78 points against Carlton both set new records for the highest in GWS's history.
Round 14 – 's score of 9.10 (64) was the lowest winning score by any team against Carlton since Round 19, 2002.
Round 17 – Carlton's 138-point losing margin against  was the heaviest defeat in the club's history.
Round 17 – Carlton's score of 4.11 (35) against  was its lowest in any match since Round 8, 2006.
Round 22 – For the second time in the season, 's winning margin of 81 points against Carlton set a new record for the highest in GWS's history.

Other
 Round 4 – Carlton won the 2015 Simpson-Henderson Trophy with its 40-point win over St Kilda. The trophy is awarded to the team which wins St Kilda's annual Anzac Day home match in Wellington.

Individual awards and records

John Nicholls Medal
The Carlton Football Club Best and Fairest awards night took place on 17 September. The John Nicholls Medal, for the best and fairest player of the club, as well as several other awards, were presented on the night.

John Nicholls Medal
The winner of the John Nicholls Medal was Patrick Cripps, who polled 68 votes to narrowly beat captain Marc Murphy (67 votes) and Zach Tuohy (64 votes). It was Cripps' first John Nicholls Medal in only his second season, having played only three senior games before the start of the season. At age 20 years 6 months, Cripps was the second-youngest winner of the Carlton best and fairest behind only John Nicholls who won aged 20 years 1 month in 1959.

Other awards
The following other awards were presented on John Nicholls Medal night:-
Best First-Year Player – Blaine Boekhorst
Best Clubman – Simon White
Women of Carlton Player Ambassador – Kade Simpson
Spirit of Carlton Award – Ed Curnow
Inner Blue Ruthless Award – Patrick Cripps
Carltonians Achievement Award – Tom Bell
Blues Coterie Most Improved Player – Tom Bell
Hyundai MVP Award (the most valuable player as voted by fans in an online poll) – Patrick Cripps

Leading Goalkickers 
Andrejs Everitt was Carlton's leading goalkicker for the season, with 31 goals. It was the first time Everitt had won Carlton's goalkicking.

Other awards
NAB AFL Rising Star
Patrick Cripps was nominated for 2015 NAB AFL Rising Star award after his Round 4 performance against . He was the favourite to win the award, but was ultimately voted to second place.

Honorific teams
Patrick Cripps was named as the centreman in the 2015 22 Under 22 team, made up of players aged 22 or less on Grand Final Day. Sam Docherty was named in the 47-man squad but was not selected for the final team.
Zach Tuohy was named as the small defender in the 2015 AFL Coaches Association All-Australian team, by virtue of polling the most votes of any small defender in the AFL Coaches Association MVP award.

Miscellaneous
Dennis Armfield won the Jim Stynes Community Leadership Award, which was awarded at the Brownlow Medal Count, in recognition of his work with the Odyssey House Drug and Rehabilitation Centre.
Chris Judd won the Madden Medal for his on-field excellence, personal development and community spirit throughout his career.
Round 4 – Marc Murphy won the Crowl-McDonald Medal as best on ground in Carlton's Anzac Day game against . The newly established medal was named for Claude Crowl (St Kilda) and Fen McDonald (Carlton) on the hundredth anniversary of their deaths in the landing at Anzac Cove.

Player and coach records

Northern Blues 
The Carlton Football Club had a full affiliation with the Northern Blues during the 2015 season. It was the thirteenth season of the clubs' affiliation, which had been in place since 2003. Carlton senior- and rookie-listed players who were not selected to play in the Carlton team were eligible to play for either the Northern Blues seniors or reserves team in the Victorian Football League. The club's nine home matches were split three ways, with three matches at the VFL club's traditional home ground Preston City Oval, four matches at Carlton's traditional home ground Ikon Park, and two matches played as curtain-raisers to Carlton AFL matches at Etihad Stadium. The Northern Blues finished 14th out of 15 in the VFL with a record of 4–14. Carlton's Brad Walsh won the Laurie Hill Trophy as Northern's best and fairest.

References

Carlton Football Club seasons
Carlton